Closet Cases of the Nerd Kind (1980) is a short film spoof of the classic science fiction film Close Encounters of the Third Kind. The film was written and produced by Rick Harper and Bob Rogers.

Plot
In the film, sewage worker Roy Dreary and a number of unusual characters meet up with strange extraterrestrials traveling to earth in a giant pie in the sky. Dreary develops an obsession with mashed potatoes, whipped cream, and maraschino cherries. He encounters singing mailboxes, truck radios that spout bubbles and bubble music, and one pie in the face after another, before finally finding himself at the Sara Loo pie factory-and his close encounter of the nerd kind.

Other characters include a wide-eyed cherubic child, a famous French scientist, a bewildered wife, plus Darth Vader on a motorcycle complaining that he is blocking the road. The film also includes a mysterious code (which turns out to be the first nine digits of the mathematical constant pi) and an oversized xylophone on which Dreary signals to the aliens. All of the character voices are over-dubbed by voice artists Corey Burton and Sandy Stotzer.

References

External links

Closet Cases of the Nerd Kind at Pyramid Media

American parody films
1980 short films
1980 films
American independent films
1980s parody films
American comedy short films
1980 comedy films
1980s English-language films
1980s American films